Pago Faao'o Togafau (born January 10, 1984) is a former American football linebacker. He was signed by the Arizona Cardinals as an undrafted free agent in 2007. He played college football at Idaho State.

Togafau was also a member of the Philadelphia Eagles, New Orleans Saints, and Tennessee Titans.

Early years
Togafau attended Long Beach Polytechnic High School in Long Beach, California and was a student and a letterman in football. In football, he was a first-team All-Moore League selection, a first-team All-Press Telegram selection as named by the Long Beach Press-Telegram, a first-team All-CIF selection, and a first-team All-Dream Team selection.

External links
 Arizona Cardinals bio
 Idaho State Bengals bio

1984 births
Players of American football from Long Beach, California
American sportspeople of Samoan descent
Idaho State Bengals football players
Arizona Cardinals players
Philadelphia Eagles players
New Orleans Saints players
Tennessee Titans players
Spokane Shock players
American football linebackers
Living people
Long Beach Polytechnic High School alumni